San Pietro is a Romanesque-style Roman Catholic church in Gallarate, region of Lombardy, Italy. This 11th-century church is the oldest in Gallarate. The upper side of the walls of the nave and the hemicycle of the apse have false loggia with columns.

References

Roman Catholic churches in Lombardy
11th-century establishments in Italy
Romanesque architecture in Lombardy
Gallarate